Oak Hill is a historic plantation house located near Cumberland, Cumberland County, Virginia.  It was built about 1810, and is a two-story, frame dwelling with a center-passage, single-pile floor plan, in the Federal style. It has a one-story rear ell added about 1940. Also on the property are a contributing bank barn (c. 1930), tobacco barn/hay barn (c. 1890), tenant dwelling/granary (c. 1890), and family cemetery.  In 1936, the property was acquired by the Resettlement Administration and conveyed by deed to the Department of Conservation and Economic Development in 1954. Since then, it has been rented to employees who are either working at the Cumberland State Forest or for other state agencies.

It was listed on the National Register of Historic Places in 2005.

References

Plantation houses in Virginia
Federal architecture in Virginia
Houses completed in 1810
Houses on the National Register of Historic Places in Virginia
Houses in Cumberland County, Virginia
National Register of Historic Places in Cumberland County, Virginia